City was an Italian free daily newspaper published in Italy.

History and profile
City was published by RCS MediaGroup. Nine separate editions were produced for the cities of Milan, Rome, Turin, Naples, Bologna, Florence, Verona, Bari and Genoa.

In the period of 2001-2002 City had a circulation of 400,000 copies.

The newspaper ceased the publication on 24 February 2012.

References

External links
 City Official Website 
 City on RCS MediaGroup corporate website

2001 establishments in Italy
2012 disestablishments in Italy
Defunct newspapers published in Italy
Free daily newspapers
Italian-language newspapers
Publications established in 2001
Publications disestablished in 2012
Defunct free daily newspapers
Newspapers published in Milan
Newspapers published in Turin
Newspapers published in Rome
Newspapers published in Naples
Newspapers published in Florence
Culture in Genoa
Daily newspapers published in Italy